Bedtime Math is a non-profit organization focused on mathematics education for young children. The organization was launched by Laura Bilodeau Overdeck in February 2012 with a website and a daily email, followed by a mobile application.

In March 2014 Bedtime Math launched Crazy 8s, a free nationwide after-school math club, designed to make math recreational. Within months, the organization received over 2,000 orders for free math club kits serving over 30,000 kids in grades K-5.

In 2018, researchers at Johns Hopkins University released results of a study that found its Crazy 8s math club significantly reduced children's feelings of math anxiety after eight weeks of participation in the club. The effect was more pronounced among younger kids in the kindergarten through second grade club. It is the largest recreational after-school math club for elementary school kids.

In 2019, Bedtime Math created Fun Factor, its new curriculum for the K-5 classroom developed in consultation with Columbia Teachers College. It features dynamic math activities that align with standards and address key concepts to meet the needs of all learners, paired with teacher professional development.

Offerings 
 Nightly math problem: Bedtime Math's core offering is its daily math problems for elementary school-age kids, broadcast by email and posted daily on the website's homepage and Facebook page.
 Apps: The organization delivers the same daily riddles via a free mobile application for Android and iPhone OS.
 Books: Based on the daily blog's popularity, Overdeck has also published four children's books (100% of her book royalties are donated toward Bedtime Math's programming).
Bedtime Math: A Fun Excuse to Stay up Late (Macmillan Children's Publishing Group, June 2013)
Bedtime Math: This Time It's Personal (Macmillan Children's Publishing Group, March 2014)
Bedtime Math: The Truth Comes Out (Macmillan Children's Publishing Group, March 2015)
How Many Guinea Pigs Can Fit on a Plane? (Macmillan Children's Publishing Group, June 2016)
 After-school math club: Bedtime Math developed Crazy 8s Club, a free after-school math club, designed to make math recreational. The program provides a free kit of materials to help host eight sessions of a weekly math club. As of 2019, there were 10,000 schools and libraries across the country who have participated.
 In-school offering: Bedtime Math created Fun Factor for the K-5 classroom. In contrast to Crazy 8s, Fun Factor activities are standards-aligned and geared towards small-group differentiated instruction.
Summer of Numbers: A summer math incentive program for libraries, in which kids track their daily math using gold star stickers on a calendar. The program, once offered through the Collaborative Summer Library Program, is now exclusively offered by Bedtime Math.
 Videos: For Math Awareness Month in April 2013, Bedtime Math produced four short math comedies.

Reception 
Bedtime Math has been featured in The New York Times parenting blog, USA Today, and National Public Radio (NPR); its books have been featured on NPR's Science Friday and reviewed in The Wall Street Journal. Time described it as "heartening news for educators who bemoan the state of science, technology, engineering and math (STEM) education in the U.S."

In 2015, an article in the journal Science reported on a randomized trial that found use of the Bedtime Math iPad app improved performance of first-graders in math at school, especially among those whose parents had high math anxiety. In 2018, the Journal of Experimental Psychology: General published new findings that showed the gains in math achievement of children who used the Bedtime Math app persisted through the end of third grade, even if they decreased or stopped using the app.

It was named one of the best online learning math apps for kids by The New York Times, and one of the few outstanding apps in early STEM learning for children by the Brookings Institution.

References 

Mathematics education reform
Non-profit organizations based in New Jersey
Summit, New Jersey